Hotel Ceuta Puerta de Africa is a hotel in Ceuta, a Spanish city bordering northern Morocco. It is located near the Palacio Municipal in the centre of the city, near the corner of Avenida Alcalde Antonio L. Sánchez Prados and the Plaza de África. The hotel has 117 rooms, two suites, a restaurant, bar and conference rooms which accommodate up to 530 people.

It belongs to the TRYP Hotels brand, which belonged to the Sol Meliá Hotels & Resorts of Spain. TRYP was sold in 2010 to Wyndham Worldwide and renamed TRYP by Wyndham.

References

Hotels in Ceuta